Devla also known as Devda is a village in the Rajkot District, Gujarat, India.

References 

Villages in Rajkot district